The  is a railway line in Aichi Prefecture, Japan, operated by the private railway operator Nagoya Railroad (Meitetsu), connecting Jingū-mae Station in Nagoya and Tokoname Station in Tokoname.

Stations 
● L: 
● S: 
● E: 
● R: 
● L: 
● MU: 

All trains stop at stations marked "●" and pass stations marked "|". Some trains stop at "▲".

Meitetsu Airport Line

The  is a railway line in Aichi Prefecture, Japan, operated by the private railway operator Nagoya Railroad (Meitetsu), connecting Tokoname Station and Central Japan International Airport Station in Tokoname. The line opened, dual track and electrified, on 29 January 2005, and features a 1,076 m bridge over Ise Bay to the artificial island where the airport is situated. The line is operated as an extension of the Meitetsu Tokoname Line.

Rolling stock

Limited express
 1700 series 
 2000 series (Used on μ-Sky service)
 2200 series

History

The Aichi Electric Railway opened the Ōno (now Ōnomachi) to Tenma (since closed) section in 1912, electrified at 600 V DC, and extended the line 500 m to Jingū-mae and from Ōnomachi to Tokoname the following year. The Ōe to Ōnomachi section was double-tracked between 1920 and 1925, and in 1929, the voltage was increased to 1,500 V DC.

In 1935, the company merged with Meitetsu, and in 1942, the Jingū-mae to Ōe section was double-tracked.

The Ōnomachi to Tokoname section was double-tracked between 1962 and 1972, and the Meitetsu Airport Line extension opened in 2005.

See also
 List of railway lines in Japan

References
This article incorporates material from the corresponding article in the Japanese Wikipedia.

External links 
  
  

Rail transport in Aichi Prefecture
Railway lines opened in 1913
1913 establishments in Japan
Airport Line
Airport rail links in Japan
Railway lines opened in 2005
1067 mm gauge railways in Japan